D2 motorway is a highway in the Czech Republic. It runs from the City of Brno to the border with Slovakia at the Morava river near Lanžhot, from where the Slovak diaľnica D2 leads to Bratislava. 

Construction on the D2 highway began in 1974; the first  opened in 1978. After the 1993 dissolution of Czechoslovakia,  remain in Czech Republic,  in Slovakia.

Features

Images

See also
Motorway D2 (Slovakia)

External links

D02